Jorge Basso (born 28 April 1956) is a Uruguayan physician and politician of the Socialist Party – Broad Front, who served as Minister of Public Health from 2015 to 2020, during the second administration of Tabaré Vázquez.

References 

Uruguayan people of Italian descent
20th-century Uruguayan physicians
Socialist Party of Uruguay politicians
Ministers for Public Health of Uruguay
Living people
1956 births